The Big Impression, known as Alistair McGowan's Big Impression for the first three series, is a British comedy sketch show. It features Alistair McGowan and Ronni Ancona impersonating personalities from entertainment and sport. Four series and a number of specials were made by Vera Productions and it was first broadcast on BBC One between 2000 and 2004.

The series has won five awards, including the BAFTA TV Award for Best Comedy Programme or Series in 2003.

Production
McGowan and Ancona first met at a comedy club, and later started dating. They worked together on a number of projects, with their first television series being The Staggering Stories of Ferdinand de Bargos in 1989. After performing in his own show in Edinburgh in 1998, McGowan was approached by a BBC executive about working on a series, which he wanted Ancona to be involved in. Alistair McGowan's Big Impression first aired on BBC One in 2000, with the couple splitting up just before filming began. Speaking with The Independent, Ancona said working on the series was "exciting but it was tricky and there were some very low points. [...] But, if anything, the tension added a little frisson to some of the sketches and it made the show better."

For the fourth series in 2003, McGowan's name was dropped from the show's title.

Impressions

Alistair McGowan
There have been many characters that Alistair McGowan and Ronni Ancona have impersonated. Some celebrities that McGowan has done impressions of include:

Charles, Prince of Wales
Lawrence Llewelyn-Bowen
Richard Madeley
David Beckham
Michael Parkinson
Robert Kilroy Silk
Angus Deayton
Jonathan Ross
Huw Edwards
Gary Lineker
Robert Winston
Sven-Göran Eriksson
Alan Davies (As Jonathan from Jonathan Creek)
Craig Cash (As Dave Best from The Royle Family)
Michael Douglas
Alan Titchmarsh
Tony Blair
June Brown (As Dot Branning from EastEnders and a version of Albert Steptoe) in spoof "Cotton & Son")
John Altman (As Nick Cotton from EastEnders with the voice of Harold Steptoe in spoof "Cotton & Son")
Cary Grant
Terry Wogan
Trinny Woodall
Billy Connolly
Griff Rhys Jones
Leonard Rossiter
Kevin Keegan
Nicky Campbell
Jeremy Clarkson
Brian May
Frank Butcher

Ronni Ancona
Some celebrities that Ancona has done impressions of include:

Judy Finnigan
Carol Smillie
Victoria Beckham
Ruby Wax
Barbara Windsor (As Peggy Mitchell from EastEnders)
Caroline Aherne (As Denise Best/Royle from The Royle Family)
Catherine Zeta-Jones
Camilla, Duchess of Cornwall
Davina McCall
Christine Hamilton
Nigella Lawson
Audrey Hepburn
Jennie Bond
Jerry Hall
Charlie Dimmock
Jessie Wallace (As Kat Slater from EastEnders)
Lorraine Kelly
Nancy Dell'Olio
Susannah Constantine
Sharon Osbourne
Penélope Cruz

Episodes
Four series of the programme were made between 2000 and 2003.

Special episodes
There have also been a number of one-off specials, including:
 Alistair McGowan's 2000 Impressions (30 December 2000)
 Alistair McGowan's Big 'Enders (10 August 2001)
 Alistair McGowan's Big World Cup (31 May 2002)
 Alistair McGowan's Big Jubilee (2 June 2002)
 The Big Impression Christmas Special (25 December 2002)
 Posh & Becks' Big Impression (25 December 2003)
 The Big Impression Euro 2004 Special (10 June 2004)

Awards
The series has been nominated for a number of awards, winning one from BAFTA, two from the Royal Television Society, and two British Comedy Awards.

References

External links
 Comedy Guide
Alistair McGowan's Big Impression at BBC Online
The Big Impression at BBC Online

2000 British television series debuts
2004 British television series endings
2000s British comedy television series
BBC television comedy
BBC television sketch shows